Dame is a female noble title equivalent to "sir" for knights.

Dame or Dames may also refer to:

 Dame (surname), a surname
 Dames (surname), a surname
 Dames (film), a 1934 Warner Bros. musical comedy film 
 Damè, a town and arrondissement in southern Benin
 Dame (Go), a term in game of Go
 "Dame" (Luis Miguel song), 1996 song by Luis Miguel
 "Dame" (RBD song), 2006 song by RBD
 Delhi Airport Metro Express, an express line of the Delhi Metro network.
 Pantomime dame
 A title of respect for certain Benedictine nuns equivalent to the male "Dom"
 An old word for the game pieces in the game of draughts or checkers
 A nickname of NBA player Damian Lillard
 The Dame, a music hall in Lexington, Kentucky, United States
A term for certain fast-talking female characters in Hollywood movies from the 1940s and 1950s
A term for a matron at Eton College

References